Branchton is an unincorporated community in Butler County, Pennsylvania, United States. Branchton had a post office until April 23, 2005; it still has its own ZIP code, 16021.

References

Unincorporated communities in Butler County, Pennsylvania
Unincorporated communities in Pennsylvania